The ATA-214 class was a group of five auxiliary tugs built for the United States Navy in World War II and decommissioned shortly thereafter. They were laid down initially as s, but on 10 July 1944 the last ten ships of the latter class were cancelled. On 5 August 1944 the cancellation was rescinded for those on which construction had commenced (these five), and they were directed to be completed as tugs. The originally assigned names were dropped, and they were identified only by hull numbers ATA-214 through ATA-218.

Some changes were made as construction progressed. After the first two were completed (ATA-214 and ATA-216) the mainmast was moved forward to rest directly behind the funnel, and the boom on this mast was eliminated as unnecessary. Armament varied as well, based upon experiences with the Ailanthus class vessels already built. The first two completed had a single 3" gun mounted on a platform ahead of the bridge, and three 20mm antiaircraft guns mounted in two tiers in front of the funnel. It was found that the upper of these three was too close to the funnel, and for the next two (ATA-215 and ATA-217) this mount was relocated immediately behind the mainmast. For the last ship (ATA-218) the 3" gun was eliminated (though its platform remained) and two 40mm AA guns were mounted on the forecastle.

All five served in the Pacific theater, and ATA-215, ATA-216, and ATA-218 also participated in the occupation of Japan in various periods from September to November 1945. ATA-215 was loaned to the Ronne Antarctic Research Expedition and sold upon its return; the others were sold through the Maritime Commission.

Ships

References

World War II auxiliary ships of the United States
ATA-214-class tugs
Auxiliary tugboat classes